The 2016 Eastern Kentucky Colonels football team represented Eastern Kentucky University during the 2016 NCAA Division I FCS football season. They were led by first-year head coach  Mark Elder and played their home games at Roy Kidd Stadium. They were a member of the Ohio Valley Conference. They finished the season 3–8, 2–6 in OVC play to finish in eighth place.

Schedule

Source: Schedule

Game summaries

at Purdue

Pikeville

at Ball State

at Tennessee Tech

Southeast Missouri State

at Tennessee State

Jacksonville State

at Tennessee–Martin

Murray State

at Austin Peay

Eastern Illinois

Roster

References

Eastern Kentucky
Eastern Kentucky Colonels football seasons
Eastern Kentucky Colonels football